Joseph J. Daniel (1784–1848) was a North Carolina jurist. He was a cousin of John R. J. Daniel.

Born in Halifax County, North Carolina, Daniel studied law under William R. Davie. He became a respected lawyer and was elected to represent Halifax in the North Carolina House of Commons in 1807, 1811, 1812, and 1815. In 1816, the legislature appointed him to be a superior court judge, and in 1832, it elevated him to the North Carolina Supreme Court, where he served until his death in 1848.

As a superior court judge, Daniel presided over North Carolina v. Mann, the case which provided a famous legal defense of the rights of slaveowners over their property. The jury's verdict and Judge Daniel's sentence were overturned by the North Carolina Supreme Court.

References
History of Halifax County
North Carolina Manual of 1913

Members of the North Carolina House of Representatives
Justices of the North Carolina Supreme Court
1784 births
1848 deaths
People from Halifax County, North Carolina
19th-century American politicians
19th-century American judges